Doña Clarines is a 1951 Mexican film adapted from the play by Joaquín Álvarez Quintero and Serafín Álvarez Quintero. It stars Sara García.

Cast
 Sara García - Clara Urrutia 'Doña Clarines'
 Ricardo Adalid	
 Lupe Carriles		
 Felipe de Flores	
 José Escanero
 José Luis Fernández		
 Ángel Garasa
 Carmelita González		
 Yadira Jiménez	
 José Pidal
 Salvador Quiroz	
 Gloria Rodríguez
 Humberto Rodríguez
 Gustavo Rojo
 Andrés Soler

External links
 

1951 films
1950s Spanish-language films
Mexican comedy-drama films
1951 comedy-drama films
Mexican black-and-white films
1950s Mexican films